The Baileys Harbor Range Lights are a pair of lighthouses arranged in a range light configuration, located near Baileys Harbor in Door County, Wisconsin, United States.

History
The range lights replaced the Baileys Harbor Lighthouse in 1870 at a cost of $6,000. It was added to the National Register of Historic Places in 1989, as reference number 89001466 as the Baileys Harbor Range Light. Currently part of the Ridges wildlife sanctuary, which is listed on the List of National Natural Landmarks in Wisconsin. The grounds may be visited and guided tours are given during peak tourist seasons.

The Bailey's Harbor Range Light is listed on the National Register of Historic Places, Reference #89001466, as BAILEYS HARBOR RANGE LIGHT. It is also on the State List/Inventory as of 1988.

After 1969, the Coast Guard removed lighting equipment from the original buildings and replaced them with a single directional light on the beach. In 1990, the Ridges Sanctuary took possession of the buildings and began restoring them; this was completed during the 1990s, when both buildings were rewired to supply electricity to the lamps. A skeleton tower, which was listed in Volume VII of the United States Coast Guard light list, provided shipping guidance until 2015, when the original range lights were updated with modern LED lamps and brought back online.

Gallery

Notes

Further reading

Door County Maritime Museum, Baileys Harbor Range Lights.
 Havighurst, Walter (1943) The Long Ships Passing: The Story of the Great Lakes, Macmillan Publishers.
 Oleszewski, Wes, Great Lakes Lighthouses, American and Canadian: A Comprehensive Directory/Guide to Great Lakes Lighthouses, (Gwinn, Michigan: Avery Color Studios, Inc., 1998) .
Pepper, Terry, Seeing the Light, Baileys Harbor Range Lights.
 
 Sapulski, Wayne S., (2001) Lighthouses of Lake Michigan: Past and Present (Paperback) (Fowlerville: Wilderness Adventure Books) ; .
 Wright, Larry and Wright, Patricia, Great Lakes Lighthouses Encyclopedia Hardback (Erin: Boston Mills Press, 2006) .

External links

Door County Lighthouses, Door County Marine Museum.

Satellite View, Baileys Harbor Range Lights at Google Maps.

Lighthouses completed in 1870
Lighthouses in Door County, Wisconsin
Lighthouses on the National Register of Historic Places in Wisconsin
Historic districts on the National Register of Historic Places in Wisconsin
National Register of Historic Places in Door County, Wisconsin